Lion Island is a river island that is located at the mouth to the Hawkesbury River inside Broken Bay, in the state of New South Wales, Australia. It is a descriptive name because it resembles a Sphinx, a mythical figure of a crouching lion.

Etymology
The island was originally named Mount Elliott Island by Governor Arthur Phillip in 1789, because it resembled Gibraltar where his friend, General Elliott, had inflicted defeats on French and Spanish fleets. This name continued to be used by cartographers until the 1920s.

Nature reserve status
In 1956, the Lion Island Fauna Reserve was established on the island. In 1977, it was reclassified as the Lion Island Nature Reserve, a protected nature reserve under the National Parks and Wildlife Act 1967 and is administered by the NSW National Parks & Wildlife Service.

Due to the island's significant biodiversity it was added to the Australian National Heritage List in December 2006. The island is a breeding habitat for shearwaters and is free of feral cats and foxes. The island has a weed infestation problem that includes Bitou Bush and Lantana.

Little penguin colony 
Lion Island contains the largest population of little penguins in the Sydney area. In 2007, the population was approximately 300 breeding pairs and appeared to be stable.

A more recent study has suggested that the colony has been in steep decline since the 1990s. No primary cause of the decline has been identified. By comparison, the nearby colony at Manly is believed to be stable.

Lion Island supports mammalian predators, namely water rats, which have been observed running along the water's edge at night. Rat nest depredation has been proven to impact the little penguin population on Granite Island in South Australia.

In 2012, penguin researchers observed that penguins' feeding trips were much longer than those taken by the population on Bowen Island in the Jervis Bay Territory.

In 2021, efforts were made to clear storm debris that had washed up ahead of penguin breeding season.

Access restrictions
Public access to the island is by permit, provided by the National Parks and Wildlife Service Regional Manager, and is restricted to conservation, education and research purposes. No recreational facilities are provided on the island.

August 2018 Fire 
On the evening of 25 August 2018 it was reported that Lion Island was fully engulfed in flames following a lightning strike. Further reports in relation to the impact on the island and the island's fauna are expected.

Geography
The cap at the Eastern end of Lion Island is composed of Hawkesbury Sandstone.  The shores of the island are composed of the older Narrabeen Group of sandstones and shales.

Media
In 2005, a documentary film claimed erroneously that the wreckage of a Japanese midget submarine, which disappeared after the attack on Sydney Harbour in 1942, was buried under sand on the seabed, just east of Lion Island. The wreck has since been located near Bungan Head.

See also

 Islands of New South Wales
 Protected areas of New South Wales

References

Lion Island Nature Reserve
Central Coast (New South Wales)
Islands of New South Wales
Australian National Heritage List
River islands of Australia
Protected areas established in 1956
1956 establishments in Australia
Hawkesbury River
Penguin colonies